Highway 368 (AR 368, Ark. 368, and Hwy. 368) is an east–west state highway in South Arkansas. The route of  runs essentially as a northern loop of Arkansas Highway 24 through Reader while Highway 24 runs more southerly through Bluff City. The route is maintained by the Arkansas State Highway and Transportation Department (AHTD).

Route description

The route connects the community of Reader to the state highway system. Highway 368 begins at Arkansas Highway 24 in Nevada County east of Prescott and runs east to Reader. The route passes the Reader Railroad Depot and Reader Park before it turns south after an intersection with Main Street. It terminates after running through forest land at Highway 24.

History
The route was created by the Arkansas State Highway Commission on November 23, 1966.

Major intersections

See also

References

External links

368
Transportation in Nevada County, Arkansas
Transportation in Ouachita County, Arkansas